Sandra Farmand (born 13 September 1969) is a German snowboarder. She was born in Tönisvorst in North Rhine-Westphalia. She competed at the 1998 Winter Olympics, in giant slalom and halfpipe.

References

External links 
 

1969 births
Living people
People from Viersen (district)
Sportspeople from Düsseldorf (region)
German female snowboarders
Olympic snowboarders of Germany
Snowboarders at the 1998 Winter Olympics
20th-century German women